Paratendipes fuscitibia is a species of midge in the family Chironomidae.

References

Further reading

 

Chironomidae
Articles created by Qbugbot
Insects described in 1960